Ziddi (English: Stubborn) is a 1964 Hindi film directed by Pramod Chakravorty, starring Joy Mukherjee and Asha Parekh.

The film has music by S. D. Burman and lyrics by Hasrat Jaipuri, creating hits like "Raat Ka Samaa". It went on to become the fourth highest-grossing film at the Indian Box Office of the year.

Plot
On the lookout for employment, Ashok (Joy Mukherjee) sees the photographs of beautiful Asha (Asha Parekh), and decides to accept employment as the estate's Manager. His expectations are short-lived as Asha turns out to be a rich, spoiled, conceited bratty young lady. To complicate matters further, Seema (Nazima), Asha's sister is attracted to Ashok. Ashok and Asha do like and eventually end up in love with each other, but Ashok's dad (Ulhas) does not approve to their marriage as he knows of Asha's parentage, a father who is an escaped convict, in jail for murder, and a mother whose profession was: prostitution. Ashok himself sees Asha in her true colors when she sings and dances at a party, overly intoxicated.

Cast
 Joy Mukherjee as Ashok 
 Asha Parekh as Asha Singh
 Mehmood as Mahesh
 Shobha Khote as Sheela
 Dhumal as Ramdas
 Raj Mehra as Thakur Mahendra Singh
 Sulochana Latkar as Laxmi Singh
 Nazima as Seema Singh
 Mumtaz Begum as Judge's Wife
 Bela Bose as Ashok's Sister
 Madan Puri as Moti

Soundtrack

References

External links 
 

1964 films
1960s Hindi-language films
Films scored by S. D. Burman
Films directed by Pramod Chakravorty
Indian romantic drama films